"Honey at the Core" was the name given to two compilation cassettes of then up-and-coming Scottish rock artists issued in the 1980s and 1990s. Ironically, the "Honey at the Core" of the time was by another Scottish band by the name of Friends Again which evolved to become Love & Money. Neither of which appeared on either album.

The first cassette - which came together with a fanzine giving further details of the artists - was released in 1986 having been compiled by future Glasgow Herald journalist John Williamson. It is notable for providing the general public with early recordings of future stars such as Wet Wet Wet, Deacon Blue and Hue and Cry, as well as a monologue by Bing Hitler (aka Craig Ferguson).

The second cassette - featuring rare tracks by The Proclaimers, BMX Bandits and Teenage Fanclub - is entitled "Honey at the Core (Part 2)", all profits being donated to the Yorkhill Children's Trust. It was released in 1991.

Track listing for "Honey at the Core"
Side One:

Wet Wet Wet - Home and Away
Wyoming - Ambition
Goodbye Mr Mackenzie - Skimming Stones
Kevin McDermott - The Right to Reply
Deacon Blue - Take the Saints Away
Tony O'Neill - Try Again
The Painted Word - Worldwide
Pride - Love Night
Side Two:
The Big Dish - Reverend Killer
Hue and Cry - Dangerous Wreck
Kick Reaction - Your Favourite Song
The Floor - It Really Doesn't Matter
White - Fear of God
Bing Hitler - A Lecture for Burns Night
The Bluebells - Guns and Accordions

Track listing for "Honey at the Core (Part 2)"
Side One:

The Proclaimers - Leaving Home
The Liberties - Strong Heart
Carol Laula - Getting By Without You
Rhythm Hill - Never Learned to Hide
The Honeychurch - Gift
Parcel O'Rogues - Small Deeds for Big Words
Side Two:
The Groovy Little Numbers - Get It Together
BMX Bandits - Whirlpool (remix)
Teenage Fanclub - Too Involved (cuckoo mix)
Murmur - Beauty Lies
The Light - In April
Calvin's Dream - Miss America

1986 compilation albums
Scottish rock music
Compilation albums by Scottish artists
Rock compilation albums